Formulation may refer to:

 Clinical formulation
 Formulations (general discussion about formulations, its manipulations, principles and computations)
 Pharmaceutical formulation:
 Galenic formulation
 Pesticide formulation